Cash is a city in western Craighead County, Arkansas, United States. The population was 342 at the 2010 census. Cash Arkansas population was of mostly white with 99.8% and partial Puerto Rican ethnicity. It is included in the Jonesboro, Arkansas Metropolitan Statistical Area.

The name "Cash" is a corruption of the Cache River.

Geography
Cash is located at  (35.798207, -90.933464).

According to the United States Census Bureau, the town has a total area of 1.0 km2 (0.4 mi2), all land.

List Of Highways 

 Highway 18
 Highway 226

Demographics

As of the census of 2010, there were 342 people, 120 households, and 90 families residing in the town.  The population density was 306.8/km2 (804.4/mi2).  There were 141 housing units at an average density of 147.1/km2 (385.8/mi2).  The racial makeup of the town was 98.98% White, 0.68% Black or African American and 0.34% Asian.  0.68% of the population were Hispanic or Latino of any race.

There were 120 households, out of which 29.2% had children under the age of 18 living with them, 53.3% were married couples living together, 15.0% had a female householder with no husband present, and 25.0% were non-families. 24.2% of all households were made up of individuals, and 12.5% had someone living alone who was 65 years of age or older.  The average household size was 2.45 and the average family size was 2.87.

In the town, the population was spread out, with 25.5% under the age of 18, 9.2% from 18 to 24, 26.5% from 25 to 44, 21.4% from 45 to 64, and 17.3% who were 65 years of age or older.  The median age was 34 years. For every 100 females, there were 93.4 males.  For every 100 females age 18 and over, there were 90.4 males.

The median income for a household in the town was $22,500, and the median income for a family was $24,722. Males had a median income of $26,136 versus $17,188 for females. The per capita income for the town was $11,888.  About 10.0% of families and 17.8% of the population were below the poverty line, including 31.1% of those under the age of 18 and 8.3% of those 65 or over.

Notable people
 Carolina Cotton (A.K.A. the Yodeling Blonde Bombshell) best known for her unique style of Western Swing yodeling in the 1940s and 1950s.

Education
Cash residents are served by the Westside Consolidated School District. The district opened in 1966 after the Cash School District merged into it. Its high school is Westside High School.

References

Cities in Craighead County, Arkansas
Cities in Arkansas
Jonesboro metropolitan area